Sic, as the label "[sic]" found immediately following a copy of text, indicates that a use that may seem erroneous is in fact transcribed faithfully.

Sic, SIC, etc., also may refer to:

Arts, media, and entertainment
 Sic (band), styled as SIC, modern hardcore/thrash metal band from the Faroe Islands
 sic (experimental musician), styled as [sic], stage name of Jennifer Morris, a Canadian noise artist
 "(sic)", a song by American band Slipknot on the 1999 album Slipknot
 SIC (journal), 1916–1919 arts magazine edited by Pierre Albert-Birot
 [Sic] (album),  a 2005 jazz/fusion album by Austrian guitarist Alex Machacek
 S.I.C. (Krizz Kaliko EP), 2011
 SIC, 2021 movie about the sport career of Marco Simoncelli

Organizations
 Shetland Islands Council, the local authority serving Shetland, Scotland, from 1975 to the present
 SIC Ferries, a council-owned company operating inter-island ferry services in Shetland
 SIC Insurance Company, a Ghanaian insurance company
 Sociedade Independente de Comunicação, a Portuguese television network and media company that owns the following channels:
 SIC Caras
 SIC Internacional
 SIC K
 SIC Mulher
 SIC Notícias
 SIC Radical
 Standing Interpretations Committee, see International Financial Reporting Standards, to provide a common global language for business affairs
 Swiss Interbank Clearing system, a mechanism for the clearing of domestic and international payments
 Standard Industrial Classification, a system for classifying industries by a four-digit code
 United Kingdom Standard Industrial Classification of Economic Activities, intended to classify businesses according to the type of their economic activity
 Scottish Independence Convention, a Scottish convention of pro-independence forces to establish an independent Scotland.
 Security Insurance Company, in Bulgaria

Science and technology
 Segmented Integer Counter mode, a mode of operation in cryptography
 SiC or silicon carbide, a semiconductor, rare mineral, and tool-making material
 Simplified Instructional Computer, a hypothetical computer for learning systems programming
 Simultaneous Inverse Compositional, an algorithm used in facial landmark detection
 Sistema Interconectado Central, power grid in Chile
 Standard Industrial Classification, US codes for classifying industries
 Successive Interference Cancellation, a technique used in wireless communications for receiving data from two wireless sources simultaneously.
 Self-interference cancellation mode of operation of a wireless device, where the device is transmitting and receiving data at the same time.

Sports
 San Isidro Club, an Argentine rugby union club
 Sepang International Circuit, a motorsport track in Malaysia
 Sepang Racing Team, formerly known as SIC Racing Team, a Malaysian Grand Prix motorcycle racing team
 Marco Simoncelli (1987–2011), Italian motorcycle rider, known as Sic

Other
 Sic, Cluj, a commune in Romania
 Second-in-command, an officer who backs up a commander or other person in charge
 Super Imaginative Chogokin, die-cast figurines by Bandai
 To sic is a verb meaning to incite, or to command, one (such as a dog or a lawyer) to viciously attack, pursue or harass.

See also
 Sick (disambiguation)
 SC (disambiguation)